Maarjamäe Palace (or Maarjamäe Castle) is a building in Maarjamäe, Tallinn. The palace is located on the area of earlier Maarjamäe summer manor, being its main building. Nowadays, the palace is used by Estonian History Museum.

The palace was built in 1872 (or 1874). The palace is featured by historicist style.

References

External links

 Entry at National Register of Cultural Monuments

Buildings and structures in Tallinn